The C. H. Pearne Building is a commercial building situated in Cape Town, South Africa.

History 
The building, built in 1903, was designed by architects D. MacGilliveray e W. H. Grant.

Description 
The building is located at 25 Adderley Street in Cape Town's City Bowl. It currently forms part, together with the nearby buildings, of a single mixed-use complex, The Adderley.

See also 
 List of heritage sites in Cape Town CBD and the Waterfront

References

External links
 
 

Buildings and structures in Cape Town